In Germanic paganism, the indigenous religion of the ancient Germanic peoples who inhabited Germanic Europe, there were a number of different gods and goddesses. Germanic deities are attested from numerous sources, including works of literature, various chronicles, runic inscriptions, personal names, place names, and other sources. This article contains a comprehensive list of Germanic deities outside the numerous Germanic Matres and Matronae inscriptions from the 1st to 5th century CE.

Gods

Goddesses
{| class="wikitable sortable" style="font-size: 90%; width: 100%"
!Name
!Name meaning
!Attested consorts and sexual partners
!Attested children
!Attestations
|-
|Baduhenna (Latinized Germanic)
|Badu-, may be cognate to Proto-Germanic *badwa- meaning "battle." The second portion of the name -henna may be related to -henae, which appears commonly in the names of matrons.
|None attested
|None attested
|Tacitus's Annals
|-
|Bil (Old Norse)
|Contested
|None attested
|None attested
|Prose Edda
|-
|Beyla (Old Norse)
|Proposed as related to "cow," "bean," or "bee."
|Byggvir
|None attested
|Poetic Edda
|-
|Dís (Old Norse)
|"goddess"
|None attested
|None attested
|Poetic Edda
|-
|Eir (Old Norse)
|"Peace, clemency" or "help, mercy"
|None attested
|None attested
|Poetic Edda, Prose Edda
|-
|Ēostre (Old English)
|"East" (Gives her name to Easter according to Bede).
|None attested
|None attested
|De temporum ratione
|-
|Freyja (Old Norse) (See List of names of Freyja for more)
|"Lady"
|Freyr, Óðr
|Hnoss, Gersemi
|Poetic Edda, Prose Edda, Heimskringla, Sörla þáttr
|-
|Frigg (Old Norse)
|Derived from an Indo-European root meaning "Love"
(Gives her name to Friday, as the Germanic equivalent of Venus). 
|Odin (consort), Vili, Vé
|Baldr, Höðr
|Poetic Edda, Prose Edda, Gesta Danorum, Historia Langobardorum, Second Merseburg Incantation
|-
|Fulla (Old Norse)
|Possibly "bountiful"
|None attested
|None attested
|Second Merseburg Incantation, Poetic Edda, Prose Edda
|-
|Gefjun (Old Norse)
|Related to "giving"
|Skjöldr, unnamed jötunn
|Four oxen
|Prose Edda, Ynglinga saga, Völsa þáttr, 
|-
|Gersemi (Old Norse)
|"Treasure, precious object"
|None attested
|None attested
|Heimskringla
|-
|Gerðr (Old Norse)
|"Fenced in"
|Freyr
|Fjölnir (Heimskringla)
|Poetic Edda, Prose Edda, Heimskringla
|-
|Gná (Old Norse)
|Possibly related to Old Norse Gnæfa, meaning "to project"
|None attested
|None attested
|Prose Edda
|-
|Gullveig (Old Norse)
|Contested
|None attested
|None attested
|Poetic Edda
|-
| (Latinized Germanic)
|Possibly "marriage"
|Possibly Hercules Magusanus
|None attested
|Votive stone from the Netherlands (CIL XIII 8705)
|-
|Hariasa
|Possibly related to the valkyrie name Herja or meaning "goddess with lots of hair"
|None attested
|None attested
|Stone from Cologne, Germany (CIL XIII 8185)
|-
|Hlín (Old Norse)
|Possibly related to the Old Norse term hleinir, itself possibly meaning "protects"
|None attested
|None attested
|Poetic Edda, Prose Edda
|-
|Hludana (Latinized Germanic)
|"The famous"
|None attested
|None attested
|Votive stones from the Netherlands and Nordrhein-Westfalen, Germany
|-
|Hnoss (Old Norse)
|"Treasure"
|None attested
|None attested
|Prose Edda
|-
|Hretha (Old English)
|Possibly "the famous" or "the victorious"
|None attested
|None attested
|De temporum ratione
|-
|Idis (Old Norse)
|well-respected and dignified woman
|None attested
|None attested
|Merseburg charms
|-
|Ilmr (Old Norse)
|Potentially related to Old Norse ilmr, a masculine noun meaning "pleasant scent"
|None attested
|None attested
|Prose Edda, skaldic poetry
|-
|Iðunn (Old Norse)
|Possibly "ever young"
|Bragi
|None attested
|Poetic Edda, Prose Edda
|-
|Irpa (Old Norse)
|Possibly relating to "dark brown"
|None attested
|None attested
|Jómsvíkinga saga, Njáls saga
|-
|Lofn (Old Norse)
|Potentially related to "Praise"
|None attested
|None attested
|Prose Edda
|-
|Nanna (Old Norse)
|Possibly "mother" from nanna, or potentially related to nanþ-, meaning "the daring one"
|Baldr
|Forseti
|Poetic Edda, Prose Edda, Gesta Danorum, Chronicon Lethrense, Setre Comb
|-
|Nehalennia (Latinized Germanic)
|Possibly "she who is at the sea"
|None attested
|None attested
|Votive altars discovered around what is now the province of Zeeland, the Netherlands
|-
|Nerthus (Latinized Germanic, from Proto-Germanic *Nerthuz)
|Latinized form of what Old Norse Njörðr would have looked like around 1 CE.
|None attested
|None attested
|Germania
|-
|Njörun (Old Norse)
|Possibly related to the Norse god Njörðr and the Roman goddess Nerio
|None attested
|None attested
|Poetic Edda, Prose Edda, skaldic poetry
|-
|Norns (Old Norse)(Urðr, Verðandi, Skuld)
|Unknown
|None attested
|None attested
|Poetic Edda, skaldic poetry
|-
|Rán (Old Norse)
|"Theft, robbery"
|Ægir
|Nine daughters
|Poetic Edda, Prose Edda, Friðþjófs saga hins frœkna
|-
|Rindr (Old Norse)
|Possibly related to *Vrindr
|Odin
|Váli
|Poetic Edda, Prose Edda, Gesta Danorum
|-
|Sága (Old Norse)
|Possibly "to see"
|None attested
|None attested
|Poetic Edda, Prose Edda, skaldic poetry
|-
|Sandraudiga (Latinized Germanic)
|"She who dyes the sand red." 
|None attested
|None attested
|North Brabant stone
|-
|Sif (Old Norse)
|"In-law-relationship"
|Thor
|Þrúðr, Ullr
|Poetic Edda, Prose Edda
|-
|Sigyn (Old Norse)
|"Victorious girl-friend"
|Loki
|Nari, Narfi and/or Váli
|Poetic Edda, Prose Edda
|-
|Sinthgunt (Old High German)
|Contested
|None attested
|None attested
|Second Merseburg Incantation
|-
|Sjöfn (Old Norse)
|"Love"
|None attested
|None attested
|Prose Edda
|-
|Skaði (Old Norse)
|Possibly related to Scandia.
|Ullr, Odin, once Njörðr.
|Sæmingr
|Poetic Edda, Prose Edda, Ynglinga saga
|-
|Snotra (Old Norse)
|"The clever one"
|None attested
|None attested
|Prose Edda
|-
|Sól (Old Norse), Sunna (Old High German)
|"Sun"
(Gives her name to Sunday).
|Glenr
|daughter, unnamed

|Second Merseburg Incantation, Poetic Edda, Prose Edda
|-
|Syn (Old Norse)
|"Refusal"
|None attested
|None attested
|Prose Edda
|-
|Tamfana (Latinized Germanic)
|Unknown
|None attested
|None attested
|Germania, Tamfanae sacrum inscription
|-
|Þrúðr (Old Norse)
|"Power"
|None attested
|None attested
|Poetic Edda, Prose Edda, Karlevi Runestone
|-
|Þorgerðr Hölgabrúðr (Old Norse)
|Literally "Þorgerðr Hölgi's Bride"
|None attested
|Hölgi, possibly others
|Jómsvíkinga saga, Njáls saga, Skáldskaparmál, Færeyinga saga
|-
|Vár (Old Norse)
|"Beloved"
|None attested
|None attested
|Poetic Edda, Prose Edda
|-
|Vihansa (Latinized Germanic)
|"War-goddess"
|None attested
|None attested
|Votive stone from Belgium (CIL XIII 3592)
|-
|Vör (Old Norse)
|Possibly "the careful one"
|None attested
|None attested
|Prose Edda' 'Poetic Edda Thrymsvitha'
|-
|Zisa
|Possibly related to *Tiwaz|None attested|Possibly Tyr via linguistic connection
|Codex Monac, Codex Emmeran, and Suevicarum rerum scriptores|-
|}

Pseudo-deities and purported deities
 Astrild, a synonym for the Roman deity Amor or Cupid invented and used by Nordic Baroque and Rococo authors
 Frau Berchta, a purported deity and female equivalent of Berchtold proposed by Jacob Grimm
 , a purported deity potentially stemming from a folk etymology
 Holda, a purported deity proposed by Jacob Grimm
 Jecha, a purported deity potentially stemming from a folk etymology
 Jofur, a synonym for the Roman deity Jupiter invented and used by Nordic Baroque and Rococo authors
 Lahra, a purported deity potentially stemming from a folk etymology
 , a purported deity potentially stemming from a folk etymology
 Stuffo, a purported deity potentially stemming from a folk etymology

Related deities
 List of Anglo-Saxon deities
 Common Germanic deities

Notes

References

 Bellows, Henry Adams (Trans.) (1936). The Poetic Edda. Princeton University Press.
 Barnhart, Robert K (1995). The Barnhart Concise Dictionary of Etymology. HarperCollins 
 Grimm, Jacob (James Steven Stallybrass Trans.) (1888). Teutonic Mythology: Translated from the Fourth Edition with Notes and Appendix by James Stallybrass. Volume IV. London: George Bell and Sons.
 Lindow, John (2001). Norse Mythology: A Guide to the Gods, Heroes, Rituals, and Beliefs. Oxford University Press. 
 Nordisk Familjebok (1916). Available online: 
 North, Richard (1997). Heathen Gods in Old English Literature. Cambridge University Press 
 Orchard, Andy (1997). Dictionary of Norse Myth and Legend. Cassell. 
 Simek, Rudolf (2007) translated by Angela Hall. Dictionary of Northern Mythology''. D.S. Brewer. 

Deities
Germanic deities
Germanic deities and heroes